Midwinter Night's Dream is a 2004 drama film directed by Goran Paskaljevic. It is an allegory of the Yugoslav wars, starring an autistic child as the main character. When first released in Serbia, it caused some public outrage because of the sharp criticism of Serbia's role in the war.

Cast 
 Lazar Ristovski as Lazar
 Jasna Žalica as Jasna
 Jovana Mitic as Jovana

References

External links 
 
 

2004 films
2000s war drama films
Films about autism
Serbo-Croatian-language films
Films directed by Goran Paskaljević
Serbian war drama films
2004 drama films